Noise reduction may refer to:
Audio noise reduction
Image noise reduction
Soundproofing
Record restoration

See also
 Noise (disambiguation)